Clypeobarbus pseudognathodon is a species of ray-finned fish in the genus Clypeobarbus from central Africa where it is known from Lake Mweru, the Lobo River and the upper Lualaba River. Its max size is 5.5 centimeters.

References 

 

Clypeobarbus
Fish described in 1915